Ayun Pa is a district-level town (thị xã) in Gia Lai Province, in the Central Highlands of Vietnam. It used to be known as Cheo Reo after 1975. Ayun Pa covers an area of 287 km², with a population of 35,058 (2007). The town is situated in the south-eastern part of Gia Lai Province. To the east and north-east is Ia Pa District, to the south-east is Krông Pa District, to the south is Ea H'leo District in Đắk Lắk Province and to the west is Phú Thiện District.

Ayun Pa town has 8 subdivisions, including 4 urban wards (phường): Cheo Reo, Hòa Bình, Đoàn Kết, Sông Bờ, and 4 communes (xã): Ia RTô, Chư Băh, Ia RBol and Ia Sao.

Populated places in Gia Lai province
Districts of Gia Lai province
County-level towns in Vietnam